The Regional Council of Poitou-Charentes was the regional council of the French region of Poitou-Charentes until 2015. It included 55 members.

Seats

By Department
18 councillors for Charente-Maritime
14 councillors for Vienne
12 councillors for Charente
11 councillors for Deux-Sèvres

By party

Elections

2004

Past Regional Councils

1998

1992

1986

Past Presidents
 Lucien Grand (1974–1976)
 Jacques Fouchier (1976–1978)
 Francis Hardy (1978–1980)
 Fernand Chaussebourg (1980–1981)
 Michel Boucher (1981–1982)
 Jacques Santrot (1982)
 Raoul Cartraud (1982–1985)
 René Monory (1985–1986)
 Louis Fruchard (1986–1988)
 Jean-Pierre Raffarin (1988–2002)
 Dominique de la Martinière (2002)
 Élisabeth Morin (2002–2004)
 Ségolène Royal (2004-)

Politics of Poitou-Charentes
Poitou-Charentes